marchFIRST, Inc. was a web development consulting company. It was formed at the peak of the dot-com bubble by the merger of USWeb and Whittman-Hart and was named for its formation date of March 1, 2000. The name was conceived by John Guynn, a copywriter at the ad agency Mckinney and Silver.

On April 13, 2001, approximately one year after it was formed, the company filed bankruptcy.

History
The company was formed on March 1, 2000 by the merger of USWeb and Whittman-Hart and was named after its formation date of March 1, 2000. Bob Bernard, the CEO of Whittman-Hart was named CEO of the company.

On October 24, 2000, the company's stock price fell 58% in one day after the company missed earnings expectations.

In December 2000, Francisco Partners acquired 32% of the company for a $150 million contribution.

On February 13, 2001, the company missed earnings expectations again and its stock price fell another 35%.

On March 13, 2001, several executives including CEO Robert Bernard, COO Thomas Metz, and EVP Joseph Bong resigned.

On April 2, 2001, the company announced 1,700 layoffs.

On April 13, 2001, the company filed bankruptcy. On May 1, 2001, the company filed for a liquidation under Chapter 7, Title 11, United States Code.

The company sold most of its assets to Divine for $120 million. Former management, including Bernard, also acquired some assets of the company. SBI acquired additional assets of the company in June 2001. marchFIRST Norway was acquired by Itera ASA in July 2001.

References

External links

Computer companies established in 2000
Companies disestablished in 2001
Dot-com bubble
Companies formerly listed on the Nasdaq
American companies established in 2000
American companies disestablished in 2001